Melamphaes is a genus of fish in the family Melamphaidae found in Atlantic, Indian and Pacific Ocean.

Species
There are currently 37 recognized species in this genus:
 Melamphaes acanthomus Ebeling, 1962 (Slender bigscale)
 Melamphaes contradictorius Kotlyar, 2015 
 Melamphaes danae Ebeling, 1962 (Big-scale fish) 
 Melamphaes ebelingi Keene, 1973 
 Melamphaes eulepis Ebeling, 1962 
 Melamphaes eurous Kotlyar, 2016 
 Melamphaes falsidicus Kotlyar, 2011 
 Melamphaes hubbsi Ebeling, 1962 
 Melamphaes inconspicuus Kotlyar, 2015 
 Melamphaes indicus Ebeling, 1962 
 Melamphaes janae Ebeling, 1962 
 Melamphaes kobylyanskyi Kotlyar, 2015 
 Melamphaes laeviceps Ebeling, 1962 
 Melamphaes lentiginosus Kotlyar, 2015 
 Melamphaes leprus Ebeling, 1962 
 Melamphaes longivelis A. E. Parr, 1933 (Eye-brow bigscale) 
 Melamphaes lugubris C. H. Gilbert, 1890 (High-snout bigscale) 
 Melamphaes macrocephalus A. E. Parr, 1931 
 Melamphaes manifestus Kotlyar, 2011 
 Melamphaes microps (Günther, 1878) 
 Melamphaes nikolayi Kotlyar, 2012 
 Melamphaes occlusus Kotlyar, 2012 
 Melamphaes pachystomus Kotlyar, 2011 
 Melamphaes papavereus Kotlyar, 2016 
 Melamphaes parini Kotlyar, 1999
 Melamphaes parvus Ebeling, 1962 (Little bigscale) 
 Melamphaes polylepis Ebeling, 1962 
 Melamphaes proximus Kotlyar, 2015 
 Melamphaes pumilus Ebeling, 1962 
 Melamphaes shcherbachevi Kotlyar, 2015 
 Melamphaes simus Ebeling, 1962 (Ridge-head bigscale) 
 Melamphaes spinifer Ebeling, 1962 
 Melamphaes suborbitalis (T. N. Gill, 1883) (Shoulder-spine bigscale)
 Melamphaes succedaneus Kotlyar, 2015 
 Melamphaes typhlops (R. T. Lowe, 1843) 
 Melamphaes uniformis Kotlyar, 2013  
 Melamphaes xestoachidus Kotlyar, 2011

References

Stephanoberyciformes
Taxa named by Albert Günther